This article is about the demographics of the population of Saint Kitts and Nevis including population density, ethnicity, religious affiliations and other aspects of the population.

Population

According to the 2001 census the combined population of Saint Kitts and Nevis was 46,325 in 2001 (compared to 40,613 in 1991), of which 35,217 were in Saint Kitts and 11,108 in Nevis.
The population of St Kitts and Nevis in 2011 was 46,398.

Vital statistics

Ethnic groups
The population of Saint Kitts and Nevis, is predominantly African (92.7%) or mixed (2.2%). 2.2% of the population is white and 1% East Indian. In 2001, sixteen people belonged to the Amerindian population (0.03% of the total population). The remaining 0.7% of the population includes people from the Middle East (0.05%) and Chinese (0.09%).

Languages
English is the country's official language, but the main spoken language is Saint Kitts Creole English.

Religion
According to the 2001 census, 82.4% of the population of Saint Kitts and Nevis is considered Christian, 2.8% have a non-Christian religion and 5.2% have no religion or did not state a religion (3.2%).

Anglicanism constitutes the largest religious group, with 20.6% of the population. Methodists are the second largest group (19.1%). The next largest group is the Pentecostals  8.2% of the population, followed by the  Church of God (6.8%). 6.7% of the population are Roman Catholics.  Other Christians include Moravians (5.5%), Baptists (4.8%), Seventh-day Adventists (4.7%), Evangelicals (2.6%), Brethren Christian (1.8%), Jehovah's Witnesses (1.3%) and the Salvation Army (0.1%).

Other religious groups include the Rastafarian Movement (1.6% of the population), Muslims (0.3%), Hinduism (0.8%), and the Baháʼí Faith (0.04%).

References

 
Society of Saint Kitts and Nevis